Tony Fox Sales (born September 26, 1951) is an American rock musician and composer. Normally on bass guitar, Sales and his brother, Hunt Sales, have worked with Todd Rundgren, Iggy Pop, and in Tin Machine with David Bowie.

Early life and career
Born in Cleveland, Ohio, a son of 1950s/'60s TV comedian Soupy Sales (January 8, 1926 - October 22, 2009) and Barbara Fox (June 23, 1931 – May 28, 2017), Tony grew up in Detroit, Michigan, with his younger brother, Hunt Sales (born 1954).

His first musical group was Tony and the Tigers, with Hunt as drummer. The band also included Jon Pousette-Dart, son of artist Richard Pousette-Dart and later the leader of the Pousette-Dart Band. In 1966 the band appeared on the TV show I've Got a Secret hosted by Steve Allen, and performed two songs, "I'll Be On My Way" and "When The Party's Over," vintage clips of which are featured on YouTube.

Tony and The Tigers released the song "Turn It on Girl," which was a minor local hit in Detroit, and appeared twice on the show Hullabaloo: December 20, 1965, hosted by Jerry Lewis, and April 4, 1966, hosted by their father, Soupy Sales. The band also opened for The Animals at Steel Pier in Atlantic City in 1967.
 
Tony and Hunt went on to work with Chequered Past, David Bowie, Iggy Pop, Todd Rundgren, Bob Welch, Andy Fraser of Free, Harry Dean Stanton and The Cheap Dates, The Hunt Sales Memorial, Tin Machine (with Bowie), and others from 1989 to 1994.

Career
In 1970, the Sales brothers joined Todd Rundgren in the newly formed group, Runt, and recorded two albums.

They recorded 2 tracks for the  Iggy Pop/James Williamson album Kill City in 1975 and provided the rhythm section for Pop's album Lust for Life (1977), which was produced by David Bowie, who also played keyboards. The brothers joined Pop on his subsequent tour, recorded as TV Eye Live 1977 and released in 1978.

He and Anulka Dziubinska were married on August 20, 1978, in Los Angeles. He and his brother, Hunt, did some recordings together which were stored away after Tony had a car accident in 1979 so severe that he was all but dead for several minutes before being revived. He was consequently in a coma for over eight months but eventually recovered from his injuries and went back into music.

Sales and Taryn Power, daughter of the late movie star Tyrone Power and actress Linda Christian, had two children, Anthony Tyrone "Tony" Sales (born September 4, 1982) and Valentina Fox Sales (born September 10, 1983).

In 1982, Sales joined a band named Chequered Past, which included singer/actor Michael Des Barres (later of Power Station), ex-Sex Pistols guitarist Steve Jones, and Blondie’s bass player Nigel Harrison and drummer Clem Burke. According to Des Barres, the choice of name was not an idle one. "All the members have been through a lot," he told the Los Angeles Times at his house in Hollywood, including the fact that Sales had fully recovered from a debilitating auto accident. After an album released by Chequered Past in 1984 flopped the band broke up shortly afterward.

Sales joined David Bowie, Reeves Gabrels and Hunt Sales in Tin Machine in 1988. The New York Times said of the band's first album, "Tin Machine sounds as if it was made by people working together, not by a producer with a computer." On November 23, 1991, Tin Machine appeared on Saturday Night Live, which was hosted by then child actor Macaulay Culkin. Tin Machine recorded three albums and did two tours before it broke up in 1992. Bowie later stated that his memories of Tony and Hunt Sales' contribution to Lust for Life led him to invite them to join Tin Machine.

Throughout the 1990s, Sales recorded and produced and was a member of the short-lived all-star band The Cheap Dates, which included actor Harry Dean Stanton, Jeff "Skunk" Baxter and Slim Jim Phantom.

Sales and Hunt's recordings from the late 1970s were released in 2008 by Perseverance Records as a solo album, Hired Guns. An e-book about them, Quintessentially Soul Brothers: The Sales Brothers In Their Own Words by Stephanie Lynne Thorburn, was published in 2009.

Instruments
Since the middle of the eighties Sales has used a Vigier Passion Bass.

Discography

With Todd Rundgren
Runt (1970)
Runt: The Ballad of Todd Rundgren (1971)
 Something/Anything? (1972)

And with Andy Fraser of the band Free, "Till the Night is Gone"

With Iggy Pop
Kill City (recorded 1975, released 1977)
Sister Midnight (recorded 1977, released 1999)
Lust for Life (1977)
TV Eye Live 1977 (1978)

With Tin Machine
Tin Machine (1989)
Tin Machine II (1991)
Tin Machine Live: Oy Vey, Baby (1992)

Solo
Hired Guns (2008)

References

External links
 

Sales Brothers Homepage
Tony Sales' basses
Sales Brothers eBook biography, retrieved 6/1/2012

1951 births
Living people
Musicians from Cleveland
Jewish American musicians
Tin Machine members
Jewish rock musicians
Guitarists from Los Angeles
Guitarists from Detroit
Guitarists from Ohio
Utopia (American band) members
20th-century American bass guitarists
21st-century American Jews